The Portland–Columbia Toll Bridge is a toll bridge over the Delaware River between  Pennsylvania Route 611 at Portland, Pennsylvania, and U.S. Route 46 in the Columbia section of Knowlton Township, New Jersey, United States. It is owned and operated by the Delaware River Joint Toll Bridge Commission. 

New Jersey Route 94 begins on the Pennsylvania-New Jersey State Line over the river, and continues into New Jersey, though it is not signed as that route until after leaving the bridge.

History and architectural features
The bridge opened for public use on December 1, 1953.

There is no sidewalk on the bridge.

A three-lane toll plaza is located on the Pennsylvania side of the bridge, serving westbound traffic only. The cash toll for automobiles is three dollars. E-ZPass users pay one dollar and twenty-five cents. A twenty percent commuter discount is available to those making sixteen or more toll payments in a calendar month.

The Delaware Water Gap Toll Bridge, Portland–Columbia Toll Bridge and the Milford–Montague Toll Bridge were all constructed simultaneously by the Delaware River Joint Toll Bridge Commission, with work on all three started on October 15, 1951 and all three bridge openings spaced approximately every two weeks in December 1953.

References

External links
 Portland-Columbia Toll Bridge at the Delaware River Joint Toll Bridge Commission website
 An expanded view of road jurisdiction near the Portland-Columbia Toll Bridge
 

Delaware River Joint Toll Bridge Commission
1953 establishments in New Jersey
1953 establishments in Pennsylvania
Knowlton Township, New Jersey
Bridges over the Delaware River
Toll bridges in New Jersey
Toll bridges in Pennsylvania
Bridges completed in 1953
Bridges in Northampton County, Pennsylvania
Road bridges in New Jersey
Road bridges in Pennsylvania
Steel bridges in the United States
Girder bridges in the United States
Bridges in Warren County, New Jersey
Interstate vehicle bridges in the United States